The 2009 World Football Challenge was the first World Football Challenge event, an exhibition international club football competition featuring football clubs from Europe and North America, which has been held first in summer of 2009. Chelsea are the 2009 champions.

Format
In 2009, each team played the other three teams in the tournament once in a round-robin tournament format, with each game played at a neutral venue in the United States. Chelsea emerged as the World Football Challenge champion for 2009. The following four clubs participated in the 2009 tournament:

Chelsea from the Premier League in England
América from the Primera División de México in Mexico
Inter Milan from the Serie A in Italy
Milan from the Serie A in Italy

Venues
Six cities served as the venues of the 2009 World Football Challenge.

Rules

Clubs received one point for each goal scored in regulation time (up to three goals per game). Clubs earned three points for a win that does not go into penalty kicks. After 90 minutes of play, if the match was tied, each team received one point and the winner of the penalty kicks received an additional point. The team with the highest overall number of points determined the World Football Challenge champion.

Standings

Matches

Top goalscorers

References

External links

2009
2009
2009–10 in English football
2009–10 in Italian football
2009–10 in Mexican football